Ace the Bat-Hound is a superhero dog appearing in American comic books published by DC Comics. He is commonly featured as the canine crime-fighting partner of Batman and as an ally of other animal superheroes, such as Krypto, Streaky and the Legion of Super-Pets.

The character made its cinematic debut in the animated film DC League of Super-Pets, which was released in the United States on July 29, 2022.

Publication history

Ace debuted in Batman #92 (July 1955) and was created by writer Bill Finger and artist Sheldon Moldoff. Ace's introduction followed on Krypto the Superdog's debut in Adventure Comics #210 (March 1955), and by German Shepherd Dogs from detective films and serials, such as Rin Tin Tin and Ace the Wonder Dog.

Ace, along with Batwoman, Batgirl and Bat-Mite, retired from the comic in 1964, when editor Julius Schwartz instituted a "New Look" Batman that shed some of the sillier elements in the series.

Fictional character biography

Pre-Crisis
Ace was a German Shepherd Dog originally owned by an engraver named John Wilker. He was found by Batman and Robin after his master was kidnapped by a gang of counterfeiters. Batman used Ace to try to locate Wilker. Because he had already placed a large number of "lost dog" announcements for Ace in his civilian identity of Bruce Wayne, he was concerned that anyone recognizing Ace (who had a prominent star-shaped marking on his forehead) might make the connection between Bruce Wayne and Batman. To forestall that problem, he hastily improvised a hood-like mask for the dog that incorporated the bat-emblem as a dog tag dangling from Ace's collar. Ace was subsequently christened the Bat-Hound by a criminal that the dog helped Batman to apprehend.

Wilker later took a new job that made it difficult for him to take care of Ace, so he left the dog to Bruce Wayne. Wilker was never aware that Ace was the Bat-Hound or that Bruce Wayne was Batman.

An early case involved Ace tracking down a mentally unhinged ancient weapons expert who was using his own weapons to commit crimes. At one point, Ace acquired superpowers thanks to Bat-Mite, but this was short-lived. He did have his own training. For example; his specialized radio collar, when activated, told him to don his own mask (via a hands-free device) and track down Batman and Robin. Ace was used less and less over time, and for various reasons. When Bruce was overcome with night terrors, Robin suggested that Ace sleep beside him.

Ace disappeared from the Batman comics after Julius Schwartz took over as editor in 1964. His last appearance was a cameo in a story where Batman had lost his fighting spirit.

Post-Crisis

A version of Ace is seen in the cosmic realm of Limbo when the hero Animal Man takes a trip through it.

A post-Crisis version of Ace was reintroduced in Batman #462 (June 1991) by the late Alan Grant and the late Norm Breyfogle, although he has been rarely seen in recent years. This version was originally a guide dog belonging to a blind Native American named Black Wolf, who called him "Dog". The dog assisted Batman in fighting men from Black Wolf's tribe---suspects in the murder of a collector of Native American material culture (1991 NAGPRA tie-in). Following Black Wolf's death, Batman adopted Dog, renaming him Ace.

He did not wear a mask, nor was he ever referred to as Bat-Hound, and has the appearance of an English Mastiff with a bat-shaped dark patch on his flank. Ace has at times helped Batman on cases and is depicted to be very affectionate towards his owner and vice versa.

After Batman is disabled by the villain Bane, Azrael takes over the identity and ejects Ace, Nightwing, Robin and Harold Allnut from the Batcaves. Harold, a trusted confidante of Batman, takes in Ace; they live in a part of the caverns that Azrael is unfamiliar with. To keep busy, Ace enjoys playing with a robotic mouse built by Harold.

Ace disappeared without explanation after the events of the No Man's Land storyline in the late 1990s. He cameos in Ambush Bug: Year None.

A traditional Ace was seen in Final Crisis: Superman Beyond 3D. He is in Limbo with other "forgotten characters", such as Gunfire, Geist, Hardhat of the Demolition Team and Merryman of the Inferior Five. Merryman explains that everyone is here where no stories exist, because nobody is writing about them. Despite this, Superman and his allies work to rescue all the residents of Limbo, who then assist in the battle against the cosmic threat of Mandrakk.

The original Ace appeared in a flashback scene in Batman Inc. #4, thus making the current canon status of the Post-Crisis Ace unclear. In this story, Ace is trying to play with Robin, who is fuming over Kathy Kane, a.k.a. Batwoman, and her influence on Batman.

The New 52
In Batman and Robin Vol. 1: Born to Kill, as part of The New 52 (a 2011 reboot of the DC Comics universe), Bruce is seen purchasing a black Great Dane from a kennel. He later gives this dog to his son, Damian, who names him Titus. Damian rejects the dog at first, but eventually bonds with him. Writer Peter Tomasi revealed that he thought about naming Damian's dog Ace, but "it was best not to drop [Ace] in at this point in the New 52".

DC Rebirth
In DC Rebirth, a different Ace was introduced in Batman vol. 3 Annual #1, in which he is depicted as a former guard dog of the Joker who fought Batman until Joker left him and the other dogs without food in a ditch to fight amongst themselves. The dogs had card symbols on them, and the brown dog with an ace on it killed the others. He was sent to the Gotham Pound, and Alfred adopted him two days later. In order to facilitate this, Alfred actually purchases the Gotham Pound, turning it into the Martha and Thomas Wayne Humane Society. Alfred spends the next couple of months training the dog despite Bruce's objections, as he thinks Ace's wounds from the Joker's actions cannot be healed. Despite this, Alfred manages to properly train him in time for Christmas, and Bruce starts bonding with the dog after getting injured during one of his night shifts. He gets Ace a bat-mask for Christmas and calls him a "Bat Hound". Though the Gotham Pound owner described Ace as a female, Bruce and Alfred have called Ace a him, leaving the gender ambiguous.

Ace is seen later, playing with visitors. He again obeys Alfred without question.

Titus is seen as a pet living in Wayne Manor. It alerts Alfred of Duke Thomas's sneaking out. Titus and Ace are later shown sleeping in twin baskets, confirming that both dogs now exist in the same continuity. Ace is seen following Bruce Wayne around the manor after he has a difficult night out.

Much like the TV show Batman Beyond, a Great Dane named Ace is shown to have been owned by Bruce in his old age.

Other versions
In Mark Waid's and Alex Ross's Kingdom Come miniseries, Ace is portrayed as the giant winged steed of the Fourth World Batwoman. Ace is also mentioned in Howard Chaykin's Elseworlds crossover Batman/Houdini: The Devil's Workshop. During a seance attended by Bruce Wayne and mystic debunker Harry Houdini, Ace was referred to as Bruce Wayne's childhood pet. In the Elseworlds Frankenstein pastiche Batman: Castle of the Bat, Dr. Bruce Wayne tests his theories by creating a literal Bat-Hound: a dog with some of the attributes of a bat. A version of Ace appears in multiple issues of Tiny Titans, a comic created for younger readers. Ace appears in the alternate universe 'Unkillables' storyline, assisting Jason Todd.

Pre-Crisis, Superman's Batman-like identity of Nightwing included a Kandorian counterpart to Ace the Bat-Hound, a telepathic dog named "Nighthound".

In other media

Television

 Ace appears in series set in the DC Animated Universe (DCAU), with vocal effects provided by Frank Welker.
 First appearing in Batman Beyond, this version is a Great Dane mix and Bruce Wayne's pet and guard dog who was originally a puppy involved in an illegal dog-fighting ring who eventually escaped and found Wayne in Crime Alley. After being injured while saving Wayne from a member of the gang Jokerz, Wayne adopted the dog, who became his sole companion in Wayne Manor until Terry McGinnis came into their lives.
 Ace makes a cameo appearance in the Static Shock episode "Future Shock".

 Ace appears in Krypto the Superdog, voiced by Scott McNeil. Similarly to Batman, this version employs various gadgets and equipment in his crime-fighting efforts, sees himself as Batman's partner instead of his pet, and battles the pets of Batman's rogues gallery such as the Joker's hyenas, Bud and Lou; the Penguin's Bad News Birds; and Catwoman's pet cat Isis. Additionally, he becomes a member of the Dog Star Patrol later in the series.
 Ace appears in Batman: The Brave and the Bold, with vocal effects provided by Dee Bradley Baker. 
 Ace appears in the "DC Super-Pets!" segment of DC Nation Shorts, voiced by Diedrich Bader.
 Ace appears in the Robot Chicken DC Comics Special 2: Villains in Paradise.
 Ace appears in the Justice League Action episode "Best Day Ever". 
 Ace appears in the DC Super Hero Girls (2019), with vocal effects provided again by Dee Bradley Baker. This version is Barbara Gordon's pet and a retired Gotham City Police Department dog who was originally partnered with Barbara's father Commissioner Gordon.

Film
 The DCAU incarnation of Ace appears in Batman Beyond: Return of the Joker, with vocal effects provided again by Frank Welker.
 Ace appears in Lego DC Comics Super Heroes: The Flash. This version is a member of the Justice League.
 A robotic Ace appears in Batman Unlimited: Animal Instincts and Batman Unlimited: Monster Mayhem. It was originally created to serve in the Penguin's "Animiltia" before Batman reprogrammed it to help him thwart the Penguin.
 Ace appears in DC League of Super-Pets, voiced by Kevin Hart. This version is a boxer who, as a puppy, was given to a shelter by his adoptive family after he bit the infant daughter's arm while saving her from falling down a flight of stairs. In the present, he is exposed to orange Kryptonite, gaining super-strength and invulnerability, and joins forces with Krypto and other empowered shelter pets to rescue the Justice League. Following this, Ace is adopted by Batman and becomes a founding member of the League of Super-Pets.

Video games
Ace appears as an unlockable playable character in Lego Batman 3: Beyond Gotham, with vocal effects provided again by Dee Bradley Baker.

Miscellaneous
 Ace's appeal is discussed in Mythology: The DC Comics Art of Alex Ross. Ross feels that as a child, the idea of Batman having a dog is "cool", but as an adult the same idea is "outrageous".
 Ace appears in DC Super Hero Girls (2015).
 The robotic Ace appears in the Batman Unlimited shorts.

References

External links
 Ace the Bat-Hound at DC Comics Wiki
 Titus at DC Comics Wiki
 Ace the Bat-Hound at Comic Vine
 Modern day Ace biography at the Unofficial Guide to the DCU .

Batman characters
DC Comics animals
DC Comics superheroes
DC Comics male superheroes
Dog superheroes
Comics characters introduced in 1955
Characters created by Bill Finger
Characters created by Sheldon Moldoff
German shepherds
Legion of Super-Pets